"Jade" is a song by Japanese heavy metal band X Japan, released on June 28, 2011 in Europe, North and South America, and on July 13 in Japan and Southeast Asia. It is the band's third single since reuniting in 2007 and the second to feature newest member Sugizo on guitar, as well as their first worldwide release.

Background and release
With "Jade" Yoshiki wanted to create a song that would show how X Japan is "evolving," but that still retained "the beautiful melodies and aggressiveness." He stated he felt a lot of pressure when writing it, as the band knew they wanted to expand outside Japan into the Western market. The lyrics are entirely in English with the exception of a single line. With the song he wanted to express the pain that he, as well as X Japan, has experienced; saying "you should just accept it and be positive about it."

Originally set for March 15, 2011, the band decided to postpone the release of "Jade" due to the March 11 Tōhoku earthquake and tsunami. "Jade" reached number one on iTunes Spain, Sweden and Japan. It reached number 19 on Billboards Japan Hot 100.

"Jade" was the first single from X Japan's unreleased album.

Music video
A music video was recorded in January 2010 and featured on the X Japan Showcase in L.A. Premium Prototype DVD that September. Directed by Dean Karr, it was filmed as the band performed on top of the Kodak Theatre in Hollywood, California, and has the sound of the audience added to the audio.

Track listing
Written and composed by Yoshiki.
 "Jade" - 6:19

Personnel
 Toshi – vocals
 Sugizo – guitar
 Pata – guitar
 Heath – bass  
 Yoshiki – drums, guitar and orchestration
 David Campbell – orchestration
 Andy Wallace – mixing
 Stephen Marcussen – mastering

References

External links
 

X Japan songs
Songs written by Yoshiki (musician)
2011 singles
English-language Japanese songs